Angel Luis Dones Silva (born 1 December 1990 in Puerto Rico) is a judoka. He won a silver medal at the Pan American Judo Championships 2009 at El Salvador. He won a bronze medal in judo team competition at the 2014 Central American and Caribbean Games in Veracruz, Mexico.

References

External links
Centroamericanos: Cuba y República Dominicana se reparten el oro en el judo de Veracruz 2014

https://www.judoinside.com/event/6253/2009_Pan_American_U20_Championships/judo-results

Puerto Rican male judoka
Living people
1990 births